Cocina ( and/or Kitchen) is a Colombian-based monthly magazine published by Publicaciones Semana S.A. It features recipes, cooking tips, culinary tourism information, restaurant reviews, chefs, wine pairings and seasonal/holiday content going beyond the typical and traditional Colombian cuisine while still paying homage to them in certain issues.

References

External links
 

2010 establishments in Colombia
Magazines published in Colombia
Food and drink magazines
Magazines established in 2010
Mass media in Bogotá
Monthly magazines
Spanish-language magazines
Wine magazines